The 41st Golden Bell Awards (Mandarin:第41屆金鐘獎) was held on December 20, 2006 at the Kaohsiung Social Education Hall in Kaohsiung, Taiwan. The ceremony was broadcast live by Azio TV.

Winners and nominees
Below is the list of winners and nominees for the main categories.

References

2006
2006 television awards
2006 in Taiwan